Ernest Shackleton (15 February 1874 – 5 January 1922) was an Anglo-Irish polar explorer.

Shackleton or Shackelton may also refer to:

People
 Shackleton (surname), people with the surname
 Shackleton (musician), a British musician and producer

Places
 Shackelton, Georgia, United States
 Shackleton, Saskatchewan, Canada
 Shackleton, Western Australia
 Shackleton, Zimbabwe
 Shackleton (crater), a crater at the south pole of the Moon

Transportation
 Avro Shackleton, a maritime patrol aircraft
 RRS Ernest Shackleton, a ship used by the British Antarctic Survey
 RRS Shackleton, a similarly named ship of the British Antarctic Survey that served in the 1950s and 1960s

Entertainment
 Shackleton (1983 TV series), a 1983 UK television miniseries on Ernest Shackleton
 Shackleton (TV serial), a 2001 UK television miniseries on Ernest Shackleton, starring Kenneth Branagh
 The Shackeltons, a Pennsylvania-based rock group

Other uses
 Shackleton Energy Company, formed in 2007 with the goal to prepare the equipment and technologies necessary for mining the Moon

See also

Shackle (disambiguation)